Erling Mandelmann (18 November 1935 – 14 January 2018) was a Danish photographer. He began his career as a freelance photojournalist in the mid-1960s.

Biography

Mandelmann worked for 40 years as a freelance photojournalist and portrait photographer for a number of Swiss and European publications, as well as for various international organizations such as the World Health Organization, International Labour Organization, the United Nations, and Amnesty International.

He took more than 500 portraits of people, including the 14th Dalai Lama, Noël Coward, Gertrude Fehr, Nina Hagen, Johnny Hallyday, and Prince Hans-Adam of Liechtenstein. His photo-archives have been deposited at the Historical Museum of Lausanne.

Mandelmann died on 14 January 2018 at the age of 82.

Gallery

Bibliography
Miroir et Mémoire (Galeries Pilotes/René Berger), Musée des Beaux Arts, Lausanne, 1964
Aus einem Mailänder Friedhof, the magazine DU (CH), 1967
Aspects"- "5 ans d'activités autour du collectioneur Th. Ahrenberg. Artists Portraits /exhibition catalogue (CH), 1967
Un atelier de boîtes à vacherin dans la Vallée de Joux, Krebs, Basel 1971
Der Störschuhmacher im Lötschental, Krebs, Basel, 1972
Hirtenleben und Hirtenkultur im Waadtländer Jura, Krebs, Basel, 1972
Spiegel und Spiegelmacher, Krebs, Basel, 1973
Die Wallfahrt von Hornussen nach Todtmoos, Katholische Kirchgemeinde, Hornussen, 1975
Split and the Croatian Coast, Berlitz, Lausanne, 1977
Copenhagen, Berlitz, Lausanne, 1979
Jerusalem, Berlitz, Lausanne, 1979
Oxford and Stratford, Berlitz, Lausanne, 1981
South Africa, Berlitz, Lausanne, 1983
Dänemark, Walter, Olten, 1984
Toronto, Berlitz, 1986;
Moine aujourd´hui, Migros Presse/Construire, Zürich, 1986
Die Schweiz in Genf, Chaîne, Genf, 1986
Une place pour Lausanne – Flon 90, 24 Heures, Lausanne, 1990
Washington, Berlitz, 1991
New York, Berlitz, 1991
Carrières de femmes – passion d‘ingénieures, EPFL, Lausanne 1998
 "Rencontres, – portraits de 35 ans de photojournalisme", textes de Charles-Henri Favrod et Bertil Galland, Editions Benteli, 2000
 "Objectif Photoreportage, – Deux générations, trois photographes" Erling Mandelmann, Claude Huber, Pierre Izard, Editions Benteli, 2007
 "Ceux de Vézelay", Edition: L'association des amis de Vézelay, 2010
 
 Show me - 80 portraits, 80 stories, 80 years on earth, Call me Edouard Éditeurs | Publishers, 2016
  MaVie, - à travers mes écrits, des anecdotes, des articles et quelques réflexions. Rassemblés pour mes enfants. Z4 Editions, 2017

Exhibitions 

1969 :	P Galerie-Club Migros, Lausanne (CH)
1971 :	P Photo-reportages, The Danish Museum of Industrial Art, Copenhagen (DK)
1974 :	C One World for All, photokina, Köln (D)
1975 :	C RAPHO, Galerie Clinch, Paris (F)
1977 :	C The Child of this World, World Exhibition of Photography (D)
1978 :	P Lausanne 1900, Musée des arts décoratifs, Lausanne (CH)
1983 :	C 100 ans FSJ, Fédération Suisse des Journalistes, Fribourg (CH)
1986 :	C Charlottenborg Academy of Fine Arts, Copenhagen (DK)
1986 : C l'Histoire du Portrait, Le Musée de l'Élysée au Comptoire suisse, Lausanne (CH)
1987 :	P Portraits – projection de dias sur une musique de Philip Glass ("Nuit de la photo"), Musée de l'Élysée, Lausanne (CH)
1987 : C Fête des vignerons, Musée de l'appareil photo, Vevey (CH)
1992 :	C Marges, Dpt. de la prévoyance sociale, Vaud (CH)
1995 :	P Impressionen 95, expo pour les 125 ans de la Clinique Psychiatrique Universitaire, Zurich (ZH)
1995 :	P Portraits nordique, Nordisches Institut der Ernst-Moritz-Arndt Universität, Greifswald (D)
1996 :	P Foto-Porträts, Caspar-David-Friedrich Institut, Greifswald (D)
1996 :	P Mennesker paa min vej ("Rencontres" – 30 ans de portraits), Rundetaarn, Copenhagen (DK )
1997 :	P Rencontres Portraits de 30 ans de photo-journalisme, Centre vivant d'Art contemporain, Grignan / Drôme, France
1997 :	P Persönlichkeiten, Nikon Image House, Zürich (CH)
1997 :	P Portraits, Salon de Sud-Est (l'invité de la 70e édition de l'exposition), Palais des Expositions, Lyon (F)
1998 :	P Carrières de femmes & passion d'ingenieures, Pont de la Machine, Geneva; EPFL, + Forum Hôtel de Ville, Lausanne, CH
1999 :	P Rencontres, Espace Culturel Georges Sand, St. Quentin Fallavier (F)
1999 :	C Le pays de la Fête 1999, "Fête des Vignerons 1977", Musée de Pully (CH)
2000 :	P Portraits fin de siècle, Musée historique, Lausanne (CH)
2001 :	P Musée de l'Histoire Nationale, Modern collection, Château de Frederiksborg (DK)
2001 :	P Parcours de femmes, l'Université de Neuchâtel (CH)
2001 :	C Hall of mirrors, portraits from the museums collection, Museet for Fotokunst, Brandts Klædefabrik, Odense (DK)
2002 :	C Inside the sixties: g.p. 1.2.3.È Musée des Beaux-Arts, Lausanne
2002 : C London in the sixties, Organisation Mondiale de la Propriété Intellectuelle, Genève
2003 :	C Vivre entre deux mondes, Musée historique de Lausanne, 18 portraits d'immigrés
2007 :	C Objectif photoreportage, Musée Historique de Lausanne
2009 :	C Au fil du temps, – le jeu de l'âge Fondation Claude Verdan (Musée de la Main), Lausanne
2009 :	P Ceux de Vézelay – portrait d'un Bourg, expo noir/blanc, Vézeley (FR)
2010 : P Le photographe, le musicien et l'architecte, Villa "Le Lac" Le Corbusier/ Corseaux (VD) 
2010 : C Portrætter fra museets samling, Museet for Fotokunst, Brandts, Odense (DK)
2014 : P Oskar Kokoschka dans l'objectif du photographe. Fondaton Oskar Kokoschka au Musée Jenisch, dans le cadre du Festival IMAGES, Vevey (CH)
2015 : C "Cimetière monumentale de Milan", Temple de Venterol, with lecture of Dino Buzzati's novel "Weekend" (Le K). 
P = solo exhibitions; C = collective exhibitions

Collections

Mandelmann's photos are located in the following archives or collections:
Musée historique de Lausanne (base de ses archives)
Musée de l'Elysée, Lausanne
Fondation Oskar Kokoschka, Musée Jenisch, Vevey / Switzerland
Oskar Kokoschka Zentrum / Universität für angewandte kunst, Vienna / Austria
La collection nationale de portraits, Château Frederiksborg, Hillerød / Denmark
Musée de l'Art photographique Brandts, Odense / Denmark
La Bibliothèque Royale, Copenhague / Denmark
Archives-photo de l'OMS / WHO et BIT / ILO, Genève / Switzerland
Association Villa "Le Lac" Le Corbusier, Corseaux / Switzerland
Archives de Comet-Photo, déposé à la bibliothèque ETH, Zürich (entre autres, "Expo 64")
Archives du Cirque National Knie, Rapperswill / Switzerland

References

External links 

 Personal website
 Portraits of celebrities
 Swiss foundation for photography
 Historical museum of Lausanne (Switzerland)
 Erling Mandelmann on the W.H.O. Website
 Venterol.net – Erling Mandelmann Photographe 
 Villa "le Lac" Le Corbusier

1935 births
2018 deaths
20th-century Danish photographers
Danish photographers
Portrait photographers
People from Copenhagen